The 2006–07 WRU Challenge Cup, known for sponsorship reasons as the Konica Minolta Cup, was the 37th WRU Challenge Cup, the annual national rugby union cup competition of Wales. Llandovery won the title for the very first time after beating Cardiff Rugby 20 - 18 in the final.

Round 1

Round 2

Round 3

Round 4

Round 5

Round 6

Quarter finals

Semi finals

Final

WRU Challenge Cup
Challenge Cup
Wales Cup1